The Bhoj Metro (also known as the Bhopal Metro) is an under construction rapid transit system intended to serve the city of Bhopal, India, the capital of the Indian state of Madhya Pradesh. The first phase of the Bhopal Metro project consists of 28 km of line 2 & 5 being under construction. This project will cost  approximately. There will be three types of run – on road, on bridges, and underground in some locations.[3]

Background
The planned Metro in Bhopal is a heavy metro system. In May 2013. Ar. Rohit Gupta (Rohit Associates Cities & Rails Pvt.Ltd) consultants were appointed to prepare a detailed project report for the MRTS including the selection of the system for the city. Based on the multicriteria analysis and recommendations of consultants, the Government of Madhya Pradesh approved the inception report prepared by the consultant on 30 June 2014. Geotechnical surveys and formation of the company is being carried on for the implementation of the project. The project will be completed by 2021 with first phase in 2019. DPR approved by State Cabinet.

On 1 May 2019, the Asian Development Bank (ADB) gave in-principle approval to fund the Bhopal Metro project. The Union Government will stand as guarantor for the loan.

Route Network
In Phase 1, Bhopal Metro will consist of 2 lines and 28 stations.

(Karond Circle - AIIMS)
Length: 14.99 km

Alignment: Elevated & Underground

No. of Stations: 16

Stations:
 Karond Circle
 Krishi Upaj Mandi
 DIG Bungalow
 Sindhi Colony
 Nadra Bus Stand
 Bhopal Junction
 Aish Bagh Crossing
 Bogda Pul (Interchange to Red Line)
 Subhash Nagar 
 Kendriya Vidyalaya
 DB City Mall
 Sargam Cinema
 Rani Kamalapati Railway Station
 Habibganj Naka
 Alkapuri 
 AIIMS

(Bhadbhada Square – Ratnagiri Tiraha)
Length: 12.88 km

Alignment: Elevated

No. of Stations: 12

Stations:
 Bhadbadha Square
 Depot Square
 Jawahar Chowk 
 Roshanpura Square
 Minto Hall
 Lily Talkies
 Bogda Pul (Interchange to Purple Line)
 Prabhat Square 
 J.K.Road
 Indrapuri
 Piplani 
 Ratnagiri Tirahaa

Status Updates

 October 2018: DPR is approved by central government.
November 2018: Tendering may start in December.
December 2018: Detailed Geotechnical investigation study (soil testing) begins.
January 2019: Dilip Buildcon begins construction of elevated viaduct between Shubash Nagar And AIIMS starts.
April 2019: Dilip Buildcon begins pile testing.
August 2019: Construction work ongoing. MPMRCL announced metro will start operations in 2023.
September 2019: Project renamed to Bhoj Metro by Madhya Pradesh Chief Minister Kamal Nath while laying the foundation stone.
Jun 2020: Metro construction ongoing near Subhash Nagar, AIIMS. Casting yard for girders work ongoing at Kanhasaiyan.
 Aug 2020: 80 pillars already constructed. Aim is to inaugurate the metro services before August 2023.
 Aug 2021: Bhopal Metro receives bids from 4 firms for the construction of 8 Elevated stations. More than 190 pillars constructed and 50+ girders launched. The expected operation for the priority corridor from AIIMS to Subhash Nagar (8 km) is by August 2023. However, the possibility of completion of phase-I work (Total 28 km) by 2023, seems bleak due to administrative laxity and less coordination between on-ground officials. 70% of the work of the priority corridor completed.
 September 2021: Bhopal Metro's construction work continues at very slow pace. Project outlay is expected to increase from initial estimates of Rs. 6941 crore to Rs. 9000 crore. Expected operation of metro in 2023 is very unlikely.
 October 2021: Metro construction work regains some pace. Bhopal metro construction nearing its 100th girder launching. More than 95 girders launched on Line 2 stretch between AIIMS and Subhash Nagar (6.3 Km). However, no work has started on the remaining stretch of Line 2 (Subhash Nagar to Karond) and Line 5 (Depot Square to Ratnagiri) which are proposed to be completed in Phase-I by 2023. Construction agency for Metro Depot near Jinsi is likely to be finalized in second week of November.
 November 2021: MPMRCL has invited global tenders for supply of rail and electrical system for the Bhopal Metro Project. Foundation stone for construction of eight metro stations between AIIMS and Subhash Nagar laid. Chennai based URC Construction starts on-field work for metro station. Metro in Bhopal is slated to be launched by the end of 2023. Tender also launched for supply of 81 Metro cars for Bhopal Metro. Girder launching continues between DB City and Rani Kamalapati Railway Station, the only section left for girder launching in the priority corridor between AIIMS and Subhash Nagar (6.3 km).
 March 2022: KEC International-SAM India JV has won the contract for the construction of Subhash Nagar Metro Depot. The firm is likely to commence groundwork in April 2022, the construction work of Depot involving an estimated cost of Rs. 323 crores. Segment launching near Rani Kamlapati Railway station is continuing at a very slow pace. No concrete work yet visible for the construction of 8 metro stations in the priority corridor.

See also 
 Urban rail transit in India
 Indore Metro

References

External links
 Bhopal Metro
 Website dedicated to planned Bhopal Metro

Proposed rapid transit in India
Transport in Bhopal
Standard gauge railways in India
2023 in rail transport